Doruk is a Turkish given name for males. People named Doruk include:

Given name
 Doruk Çetin (born 1987), Turkish film producer
 Doruk Erkan, Turkish-American physician
 Doruk Kamış (born 1994), Turkish ice hockey player

Surname
 Belgin Doruk (1936-1995), Turkish film actress

Surnames
Turkish-language surnames
Turkish masculine given names